The 1871 West Norfolk by-election was held on 8 February 1871.  The by-election was held due to the succession to a peerage of the incumbent Conservative MP Thomas de Grey.  It was won by the unopposed Conservative candidate George Bentinck.

References

1871 elections in the United Kingdom
1871 in England
19th century in Norfolk
By-elections to the Parliament of the United Kingdom in Norfolk constituencies
Unopposed by-elections to the Parliament of the United Kingdom in English constituencies